The 2014 UCLA Bruins baseball team represents the University of California, Los Angeles in the 2014 NCAA Division I baseball season.  The Bruins compete in the Pac-12 Conference, and plays their home games in Jackie Robinson Stadium.  John Savage is in his tenth season as head coach.  The Bruins are coming off a season in which they swept through the NCAA Tournament's Los Angeles Regional, Fullerton Super Regional, and College World Series bracket to reach the final against Mississippi State, their second appearance in four years. The Bruins swept the Bulldogs in a best of three series to win their first NCAA National Championship in baseball.

Roster

Schedule

! style="background:#536895;color:#FFB300;"| Regular Season
|- valign="top" 

|- bgcolor="#ffbbb"
| Feb 14 ||  || Jackie Robinson Stadium • Los Angeles, CA || 0–1 || Lockwood (1–0) || Kaprielian (0–1) || Feldtman (1) || 925 || 0–1 ||
|- bgcolor="#ccffcc"
| Feb 15 || Portland|| Jackie Robinson Stadium • Los Angeles, CA || 12–1 || Watson (1–0) || Watts (0–1) || None || 707|| 1–1 ||
|- bgcolor="#ccffcc"
| Feb 16 || Portland || Jackie Robinson Stadium • Los Angeles, CA || 4-3 (11) || Berg (1–0) || Feldtman (0–1) || None || 801 || 2–1 ||
|- bgcolor="#ccffcc"
| Feb 18 ||  || Jackie Robinson Stadium • Los Angeles, CA || 7–1 || Dyer (1–0) || Copping (0–1) || Berg (1) || 523 || 3–1 ||
|- bgcolor="#ccffcc"
| Feb 21 || #22  || Jackie Robinson Stadium • Los Angeles, CA || 5-2 || Kaprielian (1–1) || Imhof (1-1) || None || 765 || 4–1 ||
|- bgcolor="#ffbbb"
| Feb 22 || #22 Cal Poly || Jackie Robinson Stadium • Los Angeles, CA || 0-8 || Lee (2-0) || Watson (1–1) || None || 1,465 || 4–2 ||
|- bgcolor="#ffbbb"
| Feb 23 || #22 Cal Poly || Jackie Robinson Stadium • Los Angeles, CA || 1-9 || Bloomquist (2-0) || Poteet (0–1) || None || 842 || 4-3 ||
|- bgcolor="#ffbbb"
| Feb 25 ||  || Jackie Robinson Stadium • Los Angeles, CA || 4-6 || Mazza (1-0) || Dyer (1–1) || Tate (2) || 485 || 4-4 ||
|- bgcolor="#ccffcc"
| Feb 28 ||  || Coleman Field • Cary, NC (Notre Dame Classic) || 2-1 || Kaprielian (2–1) || Fitzgerald (2-1) || Berg (2) || 292 || 5-4 ||
|-

|- bgcolor="#ccffcc"
| Mar 1 || #6  || Coleman Field • Cary, NC (Notre Dame Classic) || 2–0 || Watson (2–1) || Rodon (1–2) || Berg (3) || 2,120|| 6–4 ||
|- bgcolor="#ccffcc"
| Mar 2 ||  || Coleman Field • Cary, NC (Notre Dame Classic) || 5–0 || Poteet (1–1) || Hill (0–1) || None || 315 || 7–4 ||
|- bgcolor="#ffbbb"
| Mar 4 ||  || Jackie Robinson Stadium • Los Angeles, CA || 1-6 || McGrath (1-0) || Dyer (1-2) || None || 409 || 7-5 ||
|- bgcolor="#ffbbb"
| Mar 7 ||  || Jackie Robinson Stadium • Los Angeles, CA || 7-8 || Miller (2-1) || Kaprielian (2-2) || Karch (3) || 647 || 7-6 ||
|- bgcolor="#ffbbb"
| Mar 8 || Houston || Jackie Robinson Stadium • Los Angeles, CA || 3-4 || Lemoine (2-1) || Schuh (0-1) || Wellbrock (4) || 701 || 7-7 ||
|- bgcolor="#ccffcc"
| Mar 9 || @  || Dedeaux Field • Los Angeles, CA || 6-5 || Berg (2-0) || Nootbaar (0-1) || None || 2,259 || 8-7 || 
|- bgcolor="#ccffcc"
| Mar 11 || UC Irvine || Jackie Robinson Stadium • Los Angeles, CA || 5-0 || Dyer (2-2) || Manarino (1-1) || None || 491 || 9-7 ||
|- bgcolor="#ccffcc"
| Mar 14 || @  || Evans Diamond • Berkeley, CA || 3-2 || Kaprielian (3-2) || Hildenberger (0-1) || Berg (4) || 775 || 10-7 || 1-0
|- bgcolor="#ccffcc"
| Mar 15 || @ California || Evans Diamond • Berkeley, CA || 3-1 || Watson (3-1) || Porter (2-1) || Berg (5) || 1,081 || 11-7 || 2-0
|- bgcolor="#ccffcc"
| Mar 16 || @ California || Evans Diamond • Berkeley, CA || 6-1 || Poteet (2-1) || Theofanopoul (2-2) || None || 1,542 || 12-7 || 3-0
|- bgcolor="#ffbbb"
| Mar 21 ||  || Jackie Robinson Stadium • Los Angeles, CA || 0-2 || Monda (1-1) || Kaprielian (3-3) || Hamilton (7)  || 471 || 12-8 || 3-1
|- bgcolor="#ccffcc"
| Mar 22 || Washington State || Jackie Robinson Stadium • Los Angeles, CA || 4-2 || Watson (4-1) || Pistorese (1-1) || Berg (6) || 702 || 13-8 || 4-1
|- bgcolor="#ccffcc"
| Mar 23 || Washington State || Jackie Robinson Stadium • Los Angeles, CA || 8-7 (10) || Berg (3-0) || Hamilton (2-2) || None || 881 || 14-8 || 5-1
|- bgcolor="#ccffcc"
| Mar 25 ||  || Jackie Robinson Stadium • Los Angeles, CA || 2-1 || Dyer (3-2) || Marshall (1-2) || Berg (7)  ||  517 || 15-8 || 5-1
|- bgcolor="#ccffcc"
| Mar 28 ||  || Jackie Robinson Stadium • Los Angeles, CA || 7-3 || Kaprielian (4-3) || Lilek (3-2) || None || 774 || 16-8 || 6-1
|- bgcolor="#ffbbb" 
| Mar 29 || Arizona State || Jackie Robinson Stadium • Los Angeles, CA || 5-8 || Kellogg (3-2) || Watson (4-2) || Burr (6) || 827 || 16-9 || 6-2
|- bgcolor="#ffbbb"
| Mar 30 || Arizona State || Jackie Robinson Stadium • Los Angeles, CA || 5-6 (10) || Burr (2-2) || Berg (3-1) || None || 1,201 || 16-10 || 6-3
|-

|- bgcolor="#ccffcc"
| Apr 1 || @  || George C. Page Stadium • Los Angeles, CA || 5-3 || Dyer (4-2) || Peabody (3-1) || Berg (8) || 327 || 17-10 || 6-3
|- bgcolor="#ccffcc"
| Apr 4 || @  || Blair Field • Long Beach, CA || 1-0 (11) || Kern (1-0) || Provencher (4-5) || Berg (9) || 1,586 || 18-10 || 6-3
|- bgcolor="#ffbbb"
| Apr 5 || Long Beach State || Jackie Robinson Stadium • Los Angeles, CA || 0-4 || Frye (1-0) || Watson (4-3) || Millison (1) || 969 || 18-11 || 6-3
|- bgcolor="#ffbbb"
| Apr 6 || @ Long Beach State || Blair Field • Long Beach, CA || 5-8 || Rosetta (1-0) || Poteet (2-2) || Lombana (1) || 2,582 || 18-12 || 6-3
|- bgcolor="#ffbbb"
| Apr 8 || @  || Goodwin Field • Fullerton, CA || 3-4 || Chambers (2-0) || Dyer (4-3) || Davis (4) || 2,751 || 18-13 || 6-3
|- bgcolor="#ccffcc"
| Apr 11 || @ Arizona || Hi Corbett Field • Tucson, AZ || 8-0 || Kaprielian (5-3) || Farris (4-4) || None || 3,406 || 19-13 || 7-3
|- bgcolor="#ffbbb"
| Apr 12 || @ Arizona || Hi Corbett Field • Tucson, AZ || 2-3 || Hamlin (5-2) || Watson (4-4) || None || 2,769 || 19-14 || 7-4
|- bgcolor="#ffbbb"
| Apr 13 || @ Arizona || Hi Corbett Field • Tucson, AZ || 5-6 || Dalbec (2-2) || Burke (0-1) || None || 2,597 || 19-15 || 7-5
|- bgcolor="#ccffcc"
| Apr 17 || @  || Smith's Ballpark • Salt Lake City, UT || 3-1 || Dyer (5-3) || Green (1-3) || Kern (1) || 918 || 20-15 || 8-5
|- bgcolor="#ffbbb"
| Apr 18 || @ Utah || Smith's Ballpark • Salt Lake City, UT || 6-8 || Watrous (2-4) || Watson (4-5) || Green (6) || 1,768 || 20-16 || 8-6
|- bgcolor="#ccffcc"
| Apr 19 || @ Utah || Smith's Ballpark • Salt Lake City, UT || 7-3 || Poteet (3-2) || Adams (0-2) || None || 1,125 || 21-16 || 9-6
|- bgcolor="#ccffcc"
| Apr 22 ||  || Jackie Robinson Stadium • Los Angeles, CA || 3-0 || Dyer (6-3) || Arriaga (3-3) || Kern (2) || 508 || 22-16 || 9-6
|- bgcolor="#ffbbb"
| Apr 24 ||  || Jackie Robinson Stadium • Los Angeles, CA || 0-10 || Strahan (4-3) || Kaprielian (5-4) || None || 870 || 22-17 || 9-7
|- bgcolor="#ffbbb"
| Apr 25 || USC || Jackie Robinson Stadium • Los Angeles, CA || 2-3 || Wheatley (4-1) || Watson (4-6) || Davis (6) || 1,319 || 22-18 || 9-8
|- bgcolor="#ffbbb"
| Apr 26 || USC || Jackie Robinson Stadium • Los Angeles, CA || 4-7 || Davis (2-3) || Kern (1-1) || None || 1,166 || 22-19 || 9-9
|- 
| Apr 29 || @  || Caesar Uyesaka Stadium • Santa Barbara, CA || 5-5 || None || None || None || 320 || 22-19-1 || 9-9
|-

|- bgcolor="#ccffcc"
| May 2 ||  || Jackie Robinson Stadium • Los Angeles, CA || 7-2 || Kaprielian (6-4) || Quantrill (3-5) || Kern (3) || 956 || 23-19-1 || 10-9 
|- bgcolor="#ffbbb"
| May 3 || Stanford || Jackie Robinson Stadium • Los Angeles, CA || 0-5 || Hochstatter (7-1) || Watson (4-7) || None || 1,314 || 23-20-1 || 10-10
|- bgcolor="#ffbbb"
| May 4 || Stanford || Jackie Robinson Stadium • Los Angeles, CA || 2-5 || Vanegas, AJ (2-2) || Poteet (3-3) || None || 1,127 || 23-21-1 || 10-11 
|- bgcolor="#ffbbb"
| May 6 ||  || Jackie Robinson Stadium • Los Angeles, CA || 0-1 || Bickford (4-3) || Dyer (6-4) || Gauna (4) || 454 || 23-22-1  ||
|- bgcolor="#ffbbb"
| May 9 || @ Oregon State || Goss Stadium at Coleman Field • Corvallis, OR || 2-4 || Wetzler (9-1) || Kaprielian (6-4) || Schultz (5) || 2813 || 23-23-1 || 10-12
|- bgcolor="#ffbbb"
| May 10 || @ Oregon State || Goss Stadium at Coleman Field • Corvallis, OR || 3-9 || Moore (5-3) || Watson (4-8) || None  || 3056  || 23-24-1  || 10-13
|- bgcolor="#ffbbb"
| May 11 || @ Oregon State || Goss Stadium at Coleman Field • Corvallis, OR || 2-11 || Fry (10-1) || Poteet (3-4) || None || 3209 || 23-25-1 || 10-14
|- bgcolor="#ffbbb"
| May 13 || @ UC Irvine || Cicerone Field • Irvine, CA || 2-10 || Mertin (2-2) || Dyer (6-5) || None || 1013 || 23-26-1 || 10-14
|- bgcolor="#ffbbb"
| May 16 ||  || Jackie Robinson Stadium • Los Angeles, CA || 1-2 || Thorpe (9-4) || Kaprielian (6-6) || Reed (12) || 851 || 23-27-1 ||10-15
|- bgcolor="#ffbbb"
| May 17 || Oregon || Jackie Robinson Stadium • Los Angeles, CA || 1-4 || Gold (10-1) || Watson (4-9) || Reed (13) || 1185 || 23-28-1 || 10-16 
|- bgcolor="#ffbbb"
| May 18 || Oregon || Jackie Robinson Stadium • Los Angeles, CA || 4-5 (11) || Cleavinger (3-1) || Berg (3-2)|| None || 1323  || 23-29-1 || 10-17
|- bgcolor="#ccffcc"
| May 23 || @  || Husky Ballpark • Seattle, WA || 3-0 || Kaprielian (7-6) || Fisher (6-4) || Berg (10) || 1332 || 24-29-1 || 11-17
|- bgcolor="#ccffcc"
| May 24 || @ Washington || Husky Ballpark • Seattle, WA || 6-3 || Ehret (1-0) || Rallings (5-1) || Berg (11) || 1703 || 25-29-1 || 12-17
|- bgcolor="#ffbbb"
| May 25 || @ Washington || Husky Ballpark • Seattle, WA || 1-6 || Brigham (7-3) || Poteet (3-5) || None || 1390 || 25-30-1 || 12-18
|-

Ranking movements

References

External links
Official website

Ucla Bruins
UCLA Bruins baseball seasons
UCLA